Rodney Ward is a local government area in the northernmost part of New Zealand's Auckland Region, created along with the Auckland Council in 2010. The area was previously part of Rodney District; it does not include the Hibiscus Coast, which was also part of Rodney District but is now in Albany ward. The Rodney Local Board area has the same boundaries as Rodney Ward.

Location 
Rodney stretches from the spectacular black volcanic sand beaches of Muriwai in the west to the white sands and islands of the Kowhai Coast in the east. It includes a number of regional parks or areas of special interest. North of Orewa are the coastal Wenderholm, Mahurangi and Tawharanui Regional Parks. Cape Rodney-Okakari Point Marine Reserve, which surrounds Te Hāwere-a-Maki / Goat Island, was New Zealand's first marine reserve, officially opened in 1977.

Towns in the south of the ward are becoming dormitory districts for Auckland, enjoying improved access by motorway. Further north, communities are more rural. Some have become famous for particular activities, such as Puhoi and its cheese factory. Warkworth serves as a base for visitors to explore the Kowhai Coast, which includes historic Kawau Island, formerly the home of New Zealand's Governor Sir George Grey, where Mansion House is now a museum.

The area was once famous for its kauri timber mills.

Kumeu, Matakana and Huapai are known for their wineries, a number of which provide sampling, cellar-door sales, and restaurants.

Population 

Rodney ward had a population of 66,417 at the 2018 New Zealand census, an increase of 11,535 people (21.0%) since the 2013 census, and an increase of 17,058 people (34.6%) since the 2006 census. There were 22,761 households, comprising 33,123 males and 33,294 females, giving a sex ratio of 0.99 males per female. The median age was 42.2 years (compared with 37.4 years nationally), with 13,251 people (20.0%) aged under 15 years, 10,746 (16.2%) aged 15 to 29, 31,323 (47.2%) aged 30 to 64, and 11,094 (16.7%) aged 65 or older.

Ethnicities were 88.9% European/Pākehā, 11.4% Māori, 3.5% Pacific peoples, 5.7% Asian, and 1.9% other ethnicities. People may identify with more than one ethnicity.

The percentage of people born overseas was 23.3, compared with 27.1% nationally.

Although some people chose not to answer the census's question about religious affiliation, 57.7% had no religion, 31.2% were Christian, 0.8% had Māori religious beliefs, 0.8% were Hindu, 0.2% were Muslim, 0.5% were Buddhist and 1.8% had other religions.

Of those at least 15 years old, 11,238 (21.1%) people had a bachelor's or higher degree, and 8,058 (15.2%) people had no formal qualifications. The median income was $36,500, compared with $31,800 nationally. 12,027 people (22.6%) earned over $70,000 compared to 17.2% nationally. The employment status of those at least 15 was that 27,102 (51.0%) people were employed full-time, 8,988 (16.9%) were part-time, and 1,296 (2.4%) were unemployed.

Governance 

Rodney Ward is one of the 13 wards of Auckland Council and is governed by the Mayor of Auckland. It has one directly elected councillor who sits on the Auckland Council. The councillor has oversight over Rodney Local Board.

Election Results
Election Results for the Rodney Ward:

2022 Election Results

References

External links
 Rodney Ward at Auckland Council

2010 establishments in New Zealand
Wards of the Auckland Region